John James Tigert III (November 25, 1856 – November 21, 1906) was an American clergyman, editor and academic. He was a professor of Moral Philosophy at Vanderbilt University, and a Bishop of the Methodist Episcopal Church, South.

Early life
Tigert was born on November 25, 1856 in Louisville, Kentucky.

Tigert graduated from Vanderbilt University in 1877. He also attended Emory and Henry College and the University of Missouri.

Career
Tigert was a professor of Moral Philosophy at his alma mater, Vanderbilt University, from 1881 to 1890. He was a pastor in Kansas City, Missouri from 1890 to 1894, and he was elected as the editor of the books published by the M.E. Church as well as the Methodist Quarterly Review in 1894. He was appointed as a bishop of the Methodist Episcopal Church, South on May 17, 1906. He became "one of the most prominent leaders of the Southern Methodist Church."

Tigert was the author of several books.

Personal life and death
Tigert married Amelia McTyeire, the daughter of Methodist Bishop and Vanderbilt University co-founder Holland N. McTyeire, on August 28, 1878. They had a son, John J. Tigert, who served as the United States Commissioner of Education from 1921 to 1928, and the third president of the University of Florida, from 1928 to 1947. They resided in Spring Hill, Tennessee.

Tigert fell ill after a chicken bone got stuck in his throat on November 14, 1906. He died on November 21, 1906, in Tulsa, Oklahoma.

Selected works

References

1856 births
1906 deaths
19th-century Methodists
American book editors
American magazine editors
Arminian ministers
Arminian writers
Bishops of the Methodist Episcopal Church, South
Emory and Henry College alumni
People from Louisville, Kentucky
People from Spring Hill, Tennessee
University of Missouri alumni
Vanderbilt University alumni
Vanderbilt University faculty